The Counts of Schauenburg and Holstein were titles of the Frankish Empire. The dynastic family came from the County of Schauenburg near Rinteln (district Schaumburg) on the Weser in Germany. Together with its ancestral possessions in Bückeburg and Stadthagen, the House of Schauenburg ruled the County of Schauenburg and the County of Holstein. The comital titles of Holstein were subject to the liege lord, the Dukes of undivided Saxony till 1296, and thereafter the Dukes of Saxe-Lauenburg.

The counties of Schauenburg and Holstein
The County of Schaumburg originated as a medieval county, which was founded at the beginning of the 12th century. It was named after Schauenburg Castle, near Rinteln on the Weser, where the owners started calling themselves Lords (from 1295 Counts) of Schauenburg. Adolf I probably became the first Lord of Schauenburg in 1106. In 1110, Adolf I, Lord of Schauenburg was appointed by Lothair, Duke of Saxony to hold Holstein and Stormarn, including Hamburg, as fiefs.

In a battle with Denmark, however, Adolf III became prisoner of the king Valdemar II, to whom he had to give Holstein in exchange for his freedom. In 1227 Adolf III's son, Adolf IV, recovered the lost lands from Denmark. Subsequently, the House of Schaumburg were also counts of Holstein and its partitions Holstein-Itzehoe, Holstein-Kiel, Holstein-Pinneberg (till 1640), Holstein-Plön, Holstein-Segeberg and Holstein-Rendsburg (till 1460) and through the latter at times also the dukes of Schleswig.

Partitions of Holstein

Holstein partitions of 1261 and 1273
After 1261 the previously jointly ruling brothers Gerhard I and the elder John I divided the Counties of Holstein and Schauenburg (Schaumburg). Gerhard I received the Counties of Holstein-Itzehoe and Schaumburg, whereas John received the County of Holstein-Kiel. After the death of John I, his sons Adolphus V and John II reigned jointly in Holstein-Kiel. In 1273 they partitioned Holstein-Kiel and John II continued ruling over Kiel; Adolphus V the Pomeranian then received Segeberg (aka County of Stormarn). After the death of Adolphus V, Holstein-Segeberg was reincorporated into Holstein-Kiel.

Holstein partition of 1290 and reversions of 1350 and 1390
After Gerhard I's death in 1290 his three younger sons partitioned Holstein-Itzehoe and Schaumburg into three branches, with Adolph VI the Elder, the third brother, getting Holstein-Pinneberg and Schaumburg south of the Elbe, the second brother Gerhard II the Blind getting Holstein-Plön, and the fourth Henry I receiving Holstein-Rendsburg. The eldest brother John was Canon at the Hamburg Cathedral.

After the death of Gerhard II his sons Gerhard IV and his younger half-brother John III the Mild inherited and ruled in Holstein-Plön together. In 1316 the brothers militarily seized the possessions of John II the One-Eyed (d. 1321) in Holstein-Kiel, whose sons had been killed. John III the Mild, before a second-born co-ruling count in Plön, then received Kiel from the deposed John II the One-Eyed, a cousin of his father Gerhard II the Blind. Gerhard IV continued ruling Holstein-Plön as sole count.

After the death of John III's nephew Gerhard V, Count of Holstein-Plön in 1350, who had succeeded Gerhard IV, the Plön line became extinct and John III re-inherited their possessions. In 1390 his son Adolphus IX (aka VII) ruling since 1359 Kiel including Plön, died without issue and thus Nicholas (Claus) of Holstein-Rendsburg and his nephews Albert II and Gerhard VI (jointly ruling till 1397) succeeded to the territories of Holstein-Kiel and Holstein-Plön.

Holstein partition of 1397 and the extinction of the Rendsburg line in 1459
In 1390 the Holstein-Rendsburg line had assembled the larger part of the partitioned Holstein counties, to wit Kiel, Plön and Segeberg, but not Holstein-Pinneberg, which existed until 1640. Members of the Rendsburg family branch were often also simply titled as Counts of Holstein after 1390. For the Pinneberg family branch, usually residing in the County of Schaumburg, the titling after Schaumburg started to prevail.

In 1397 after the death of their uncle Nicholas (Claus), with whom the nephews Albert II and the elder Gerhard VI had jointly ruled Holstein-Rendsburg, they partitioned Holstein-Segeberg (aka county of Stormarn) from Holstein-Rendsburg, with Albert receiving the new branch county in return for waiving his co-rule in Rendsburg. After Albert's death in 1403 Segeberg reverted to Rendsberg. In 1459, with the death of Adolphus XI (aka VIII), the Rendsburg branch was extinct in the male line and the nobility of Holstein-Rendburg and of Schleswig then assigned the succession to his sister's son King Christian I of Denmark, House of Oldenburg.

The last Schauenburg line ruling Schaumburg and Holstein-Pinneberg till 1640
After King Christian I of Denmark, House of Oldenburg had been chosen as heir to the County of Holstein-Rendsburg Christian ascended to the comital throne in 1460. In 1474 Frederick III, Holy Roman Emperor, elevated Christian I from Count of Holstein-Rendsburg to Duke of Holstein. For his succession in the Duchy of Holstein see List of rulers of Schleswig-Holstein#House of Oldenburg (1460–1544). The Schauenburg line in the Counties of Holstein-Pinneberg and Schaumburg persisted until its extinction in the male line in 1640. This line is also known as Holstein-Schauenburg. The Counts were elevated to Princes of Schaumburg in 1619/1620, however, the Dukes of Holstein opposed the transition of that title to the County of Holstein-Pinneberg.

Schaumburg partition of 1640
After the death in 1640 of Count Otto V without children, the rule of the House of Schaumburg ended in Holstein. The County of Holstein-Pinneberg was merged under Christian IV with his royal share in the Duchy of Holstein, which is now part of the state of Schleswig-Holstein. For Christian IV and his successors see List of rulers of Schleswig-Holstein#House of Oldenburg (1640–1713)

The Principality of Schaumburg proper, however, was partitioned among the agnatic Schauenburg heirs into three parts, one incorporated into the Principality of Lüneburg of the Duchy of Brunswick and Lüneburg, the second becoming the County of Schaumburg-Lippe and the third continuing the name County of Schaumburg, ruled in personal union by Hesse-Cassel. All the three are now part of the state of Lower Saxony. The Sovereign Lordship of Gemen, in 1531 acquired for Schaumburg through marriage by Jobst I, and ruled by his second-born son of Jobst II (ca. 1520–1581, regnant since 1531), passed on to the family of Limburg Stirum. Gemen is in today's North Rhine-Westphalia.

House of Schauenburg

Partitions of Holstein and Schauenburg under Schauenburg rule

Table of rulers

See also
House of Schaumburg
List of Rulers of Schleswig-Holstein

External links

 Dukes of Schleswig-Holstein

Notes

Holstein
People from the Duchy of Holstein